The Border is a 1996 Italian war-drama film directed by Franco Giraldi.

Cast 

Raoul Bova as	Emidio Orlich 
Marco Leonardi as	Franco Velich 
Omero Antonutti as	Simeone 
Vesna Tominac Matačić as	Melania	
Claudia Pandolfi as	Gabriella 
Giancarlo Giannini as	Von Zirkenitz

References

External links

1996 films
1990s war drama films
Films directed by Franco Giraldi
Italian war drama films
Films scored by Luis Bacalov
Films set in Yugoslavia
Films set in Croatia
1996 drama films
War films set in Partisan Yugoslavia
1990s Italian-language films
1990s Italian films